Glenn Shafer (born November 21, 1946) is an American mathematician and statistician. He is the co-creator of Dempster–Shafer theory. He is a University Professor and Board of Governors Professor at Rutgers University.

Early life and education

Shafer grew up on a farm near Caney, Kansas. He received a bachelor's degree in mathematics from Princeton University, then entered the Peace Corps, serving in Afghanistan. He returned to Princeton, earning a PhD in mathematical statistics in 1973 under Geoffrey Watson.

Career

He taught at Princeton and the University of Kansas, joining the faculty of Rutgers Business School – Newark and New Brunswick in 1992. From 2011 to 2014 he served as dean of the school.

During the 1970s and 1980s he expanded a theory first introduced by Arthur P. Dempster to create Dempster–Shafer theory, also described as the theory of belief functions or evidence theory. It is a general framework for reasoning with uncertainty, allowing one to combine evidence from different sources and arrive at a degree of belief (represented by a mathematical object called belief function) that takes into account all the available evidence. The theory and its extensions have been of particular interest to the artificial intelligence community.

More recently he worked with Vladimir Vovk to develop a game-theoretic framework for probability. That work produced a 2001 book, Probability and Finance: It's Only a Game! A joint research group between Rutgers and Royal Holloway, University of London has produced more than 50 working papers on the subject.

Principal publications
 Shafer, Glenn, A Mathematical Theory of Evidence, Princeton University Press, 1976. 
 Shafer, Glenn, and Vovk, Vladimir, Probability and Finance: It's Only a Game!, John Wiley and Sons, 2001.

Recognition

He is designated as a Board of Governors Professor at Rutgers. The University of Prague recognized him with an honorary doctorate. He has been a Fulbright Fellow and a Guggenheim Fellow.

Personal life

He is married to retired Princeton professor and artist Nell Irvin Painter.

References

External links
Personal website

Living people
Mathematicians from New Jersey
American statisticians
Rutgers University faculty
Princeton University alumni
People from Caney, Kansas
1946 births
Mathematical statisticians
University of Kansas faculty